WPJX (1500 AM) is a radio station, licensed to Zion, Illinois, that airs a heavy metal format. The station is owned by Polnet Communications, who also owns WKTA Evanston, WNVR Vernon Hills, and WEEF Highland Park-Deerfield. The station transmits with a directional 250 watts of power from 3 towers located on the corner of Delany Road and 21st Street near Wadsworth, Illinois. The station's daytime signal serves northern Lake County, Illinois and Kenosha County, Wisconsin. WPJX was licensed to operate during daytime hours only until May 2009 when it began broadcasting 24 hours a day with a power of 250 watts daytime and 2 watts nighttime.

History
The station first began broadcasting on September 19, 1967, and originally held the callsign WZBN. The station was originally owned by the Zion-Benton Broadcasting Company.

The station was once co-owned with WKZN 96.9 (later WNIZ and now WWDV) and had studios in downtown Zion during this period.

In 1977, the station's call sign was changed to WKZN. As WKZN, it aired an MOR-Adult Contemporary format and held the callsign, simulcasting the programming of WKZN-FM 96.9.

In 1983, the station's callsign was changed to WNIZ, and the station began airing a classical music format, simulcasting the programming of its sister stations WNIZ 96.9 and WNIB 97.1. In 1984, Lake County Broadcasting Co. purchased the station from Northern Illinois Broadcasting Co. for $200,000. On December 1, 1984, the station's callsign was changed to WRJR.

On December 1, 1987, the station's callsign was changed to WKGA. As WKGA, the station aired a Spanish music format and was branded "Radio Borinquen".

On November 7, 1994, WKGA adopted a Classic Country format. In early 1996, the station was sold to Lotus Communications Corporation for $210,000, and it adopted a Regional Mexican format, simulcasting the programming of sister station 1300 WTAQ. On June 24, 1996, the station's callsign was changed to WTAU.

In 1998, the station was sold to ABC Radio, and on July 16, 1998, the station became an affiliate of Radio Disney along with its sister station WTAQ. On December 3, 1998, the station's callsign was changed to WDDZ. The station continued to simulcast Radio Disney with its sister station WRDZ until it was taken off the air on January 14, 2000.

A short-lived LMA to the owners of WBJX in Racine, Wisconsin (now WJTI) brought the station back on the air in January 2001, simulcasting WBJX and airing a Regional Mexican format. On May 16, 2001, the station's callsign was changed to WPJX. The station again signed off the air in October 2001. It returned to the air permanently in spring 2002 first with its previous format, a simulcast of Radio Disney station WRDZ La Grange.

In 2002, Multicultural Broadcasting of Chicago, Inc. purchased the station from ABC, Inc. for $70,000. Under Multicultural's ownership it aired an oldies format.

In 2006, Polnet bought the station from Multicultural Broadcasting for $230,000. When Polnet bought the station, it switched to a Spanish-language reggaeton format. In February 2009, the Heavy Metal format "Rebel Radio" began airing full-time on the station. "Rebel Radio" was replaced by a syndicated Spanish format in mid-February 2011.

On October 1, 2018, at Noon, the heavy metal format of “Rebel Radio” returned to WPJX, after an eight-year hiatus. During the first day back, Rebel Radio aired only the "Big 4" thrash metal bands: Metallica, Megadeth, Anthrax, and Slayer.

Translator
WPJX is also heard at 92.5 MHz, through an FM translator.

References

External links

PJX
Radio stations established in 1967
1967 establishments in Illinois
Former subsidiaries of The Walt Disney Company